The Black Candle is a documentary film about Kwanzaa directed by M. K. Asante and narrated by Maya Angelou. The film premiered on cable television on Starz on November, 2012.

Synopsis
The Black Candle uses Kwanzaa as a vehicle to explore and celebrate the African-American experience. Narrated by the poet Maya Angelou and directed by author and filmmaker M. K. Asante, The Black Candle is about the struggle and triumph of African-American family, community, and culture. The documentary traces the holiday's growth out of the Black Power Movement in the 1960s to its present-day reality.

Reception

Time magazine wrote "The first film about Kwanzaa, The Black Candle, narrated by Maya Angelou is fit for a poet."

The Daily Voice wrote, "I predict that viewing The Black Candle will become an annual family tradition in homes around the world."

The film won Best Full Length Documentary at the 2009 Africa World Documentary Film Festival.

In December 2020, the American Film Institute selected The Black Candle as a "holiday classic" and featured the film in AFI Movie Club Presents: Home for the Holidays, "highlighting the very best of the holiday cinema".

References

External links
American Film Institute AFI Movie Club: THE BLACK CANDLE

2008 films
Kwanzaa
American documentary films
American independent films
Films set in Africa
Documentary films about African Americans
2008 documentary films
2008 independent films
Maya Angelou
2000s English-language films
2000s American films